The 2011 NextEra Energy Resources 250 was a NASCAR Camping World Truck Series race held at Daytona International Speedway in Daytona Beach, Florida on February 18, 2011. The race was the first of the 2011 NASCAR Camping World Truck Series. Austin Dillon of Richard Childress Racing won the pole position, while Michael Waltrip of Vision Aviation Racing won.

Qualifying
46 trucks entered the race. Qualifying was held on February 17. Following Dillon was James Buescher, Ron Hornaday Jr., Ricky Carmichael and rookie Johanna Long, while the top ten closed with Elliott Sadler, Matt Crafton, Joey Coulter, Johnny Sauter and Brad Sweet. Nelson Piquet Jr. initially qualified fourth, but, along with Aric Almirola, were disqualified after post-qualifying inspection when it was revealed that their trucks were too low, and were forced to start from the rear. Rick Crawford, Cole Whitt, Tayler Malsam, Chris Eggleston, Alli Owens, Mike Skinner, Jamie Dick, Brent Raymer, Grant Enfinger and Clay Greenfield failed to qualify. Although Skinner was eligible for the past champion's provisional, due to being the 1995 series champion, his team, Eddie Sharp Racing, failed to enter the race in time.

Race
James Buescher led the first 55 laps, and on lap 37, rookie Joey Coulter cut down a tire and crashed into the turn 2 wall, bringing out the first caution of the race. On the second caution for Donnie Neuenberger's bed cover falling off the truck in turn 4, Timothy Peters took the lead after taking only fuel on lap 56, followed by Ricky Carmichael and Buescher. On lap 66, Justin Marks' hood loosened and covered the windshield, causing him to crash into turn 1. The green flag flew from lap 70 to 75, when Travis Kvapil's tire blew and hit five trucks, while Neuenberger, who was running in the back, failed to slow down in time and collided with other trucks; altogether, 14 trucks (Kvapil, Neuenberger, Max Papis, Matt Crafton, Todd Bodine, Johnny Sauter, Ron Hornaday Jr., Johanna Long, Justin Lofton, Brendan Gaughan, T. J. Bell, Jason White, Craig Goess and Jennifer Jo Cobb) were involved. On lap 85, the caution was flown after Lofton crashed into David Starr. The green flag flew from lap 89 to 97, when Aric Almirola collided with Brad Sweet, creating a nine-truck crash also involving Austin Dillon, Papis, Kyle Busch, Parker Kligerman, Bodine, Chris Fontaine and Buescher. As a result, officials stopped the race for ten minutes to clean up, and the 100-lap race was extended to initiate a green-white-checker finish.

Sometime during the lap under caution before the final restart, the right half of Waltrip's rear spoiler collapsed and fell flat, greatly reducing the aerodynamic drag on his truck that the spoiler is designed to do at Daytona, to limit top speed and encourage drafting. This suddenly gave his truck a prohibitive advantage. On the final lap, Waltrip pushed Elliott Sadler far ahead of the pack, and with his illegally advantaged truck, easily passed him on his outside in the final yards to claim his first Truck Series win, becoming the 22nd driver to win in all three of NASCAR's top series (Sprint Cup Series, Nationwide Series and Trucks). The win was on the ten-year anniversary of Waltrip's first career NASCAR Cup Series win in the 2001 Daytona 500, which was also the site of Waltrip's team owner Dale Earnhardt's death. Clay Rogers, Miguel Paludo and Kyle Busch rounded out the top five, followed by Cobb (the highest finish by a woman in the Truck Series, and the first top 10 by a female in NASCAR's top three series), Jeffrey Earnhardt, Carmichael, Buescher and Crafton.

Post-race

In victory lane, Waltrip stated:

Afterwards, NASCAR confiscated Waltrip's rear spoiler, half of it having fallen; NASCAR reported it to be a failure, but continued to examine it. NASCAR spokesman Kerry Tharp stated, "It appeared to be a failed part. The spoiler broke on the green-white-checkered finish. Our typical procedure is, instead of having an immediate reaction, we'll take a look and, if necessary, we'll have whatever reaction is appropriate the first of the week." Eventually, the team was revealed to have "violated Sections 12–1 (actions detrimental to stock car racing), 12-4-J (any determination by NASCAR officials that the race equipment used in the event does not conform to NASCAR rules), and 20B-3.1.2E (rear spoiler did not meet specifications in post-race inspection)". Vision Aviation Racing owner Billy Ballew was penalized 25 owner points, while crew chief Doug Howe was fined $25,000, and was placed on probation for the remainder of the year. As Waltrip was not competing for Truck Series points, he was not penalized any drivers points.

Results

Qualifying

Race results

Standings after the race

See also

 2011 Daytona 500

References

2011 in sports in Florida
NextEra Energy Resources 250
NASCAR races at Daytona International Speedway